= 1919 Gotha state election =

German state election

The 1919 Gotha state election was held on 25 February 1919 to elect the 19 members of the Landtag of Gotha.

== Results ==
Party	Votes	%	Seats
Independent Social Democratic Party of Germany	43,922	50.91	10
German Democratic Party	18,130	21.01	4
German National People's Party and German People's Party	12,944	15.00	3
Social Democratic Party of Germany	7,873	9.13	1
Bauernbund	3,406	3.95	1
Total	86,275	100.00	19
Registered voters/turnout	114,788	–	
Source: Elections in the Weimar Republic,
